PTV World is a 24-hour Pakistani English-language international news channel. It is a state-owned channel as a part of Pakistan Television Corporation. The service is also aimed at the overseas market and broadcast through satellite and online platforms similar to BBC World News, Arirang TV, TRT World,  Deutsche Welle, France 24, CGTN, VOA, NHK World-Japan, RT.

Based in the Islamabad, the service started on 1992 as PTV-2 but was later renamed as PTV World in 1998. It is aimed at a worldwide market and is generally broadcast by FTA television providers around the world. It is a provider of live streaming world news which can be viewed via its website, YouTube, and various mobile devices and digital media players. The stated mission of the channels is to "provide a global public service and a common editorial stance".

History
PTV World was launched in 1992 as Pakistan's first satellite TV channel “PTV-2". its name was changed to PTV World in 1998. In 2007, PTV World was replaced by PTV News but was re-inaugurated on January 29, 2013 as an English-language news TV channel.

Programmes 
Some famous programmes of this channel are:

 WORLD THIS MORNING
VIEWS ON NEWS
DIPLOMATIC ENCLAVE
SKY IS THE LIMIT
WORLD TODAY
DINE WITH WORLD
POLITICS TODAY
DIALOGUE

Reporting Team 
As of 2018, the reporting team included:

 Syed Ali Ehsan
 Gaitty Ara
 Shabir Wahgra
 Ali Andaz Haider

See also
 Pakistan Television Corporation
 PTV News
 Television in Pakistan
 List of television channels in Pakistan
List of news channels in Pakistan

References

External links 
 
 
 
 PTV World on YouTube

Pakistan Television Corporation
Television stations in Pakistan
Television stations in Islamabad
24-hour television news channels in Pakistan
24-hour television news channels
English-language television stations in Pakistan